Paula Strasberg (born Pearl Miller; March 8, 1909 – April 29, 1966) was an American stage actress. She became actor and teacher Lee Strasberg's second wife and mother of actors John and Susan Strasberg, as well as Marilyn Monroe's acting coach and confidante.

Career
Born Pearl Miller to a Jewish family, she made her debut on Broadway in 1927, appearing in The Cradle Song. Two years later, she married her first husband, Harry Stein, whom she divorced in 1935. The union was childless. She appeared in more than 20 stage roles until Me and Molly in 1948. A life member of the Actors Studio, she married Lee Strasberg in 1935, just days after her first marriage ended.

She was later blacklisted for her membership in the American Communist Party, although her husband was not a member and suffered no adverse effects on his career. She went on to become Marilyn Monroe's acting coach and confidante until Monroe's death in 1962, supplanting Natasha Lytess.

Personal life
Her children, Susan Strasberg (1938–1999) and John Strasberg (born 1941), were also actors. Susan described her mother as a "combination delicatessen, pharmacist, Jewish mother".

Death
Paula Strasberg died of bone marrow cancer at Beth Israel Hospital in Manhattan on April 29, 1966, aged 57, and is interred at Westchester Hills Cemetery in Hastings-on-Hudson, Westchester County, New York. She was survived by her husband, their two children, and a younger sister, Beatrice.

References

External links

Official site

1909 births
1966 deaths
American communists
American stage actresses
American acting coaches
Burials at Westchester Hills Cemetery
Hollywood blacklist
Jewish American actresses
Actresses from New York City
Deaths from cancer in New York (state)
Deaths from multiple myeloma
20th-century American actresses
20th-century American musicians